Xho or XHO may refer to:
 the ISO 639 code for the Xhosa language
 XHO-FM, a Spanish news/talk radio station for Brownsville, Texas
 XHO-TDT, a repeater station in Torreón, Mexico, for the TV network Las Estrellas